In mathematics, the Bernoulli scheme or Bernoulli shift is a generalization of the Bernoulli process to more than two possible outcomes. Bernoulli schemes appear naturally in symbolic dynamics, and are thus important in the study of dynamical systems. Many important dynamical systems (such as Axiom A systems) exhibit a repellor that is the product of the Cantor set and a smooth manifold, and the dynamics on the Cantor set are isomorphic to that of the Bernoulli shift. This is essentially the Markov partition. The term shift is in reference to the shift operator, which may be used to study Bernoulli schemes.  The Ornstein isomorphism theorem shows that Bernoulli shifts are isomorphic when their entropy is equal.

Definition
A Bernoulli scheme is a discrete-time stochastic process where each independent random variable may take on one of N distinct possible values, with the outcome i occurring with probability , with i = 1, ..., N, and

The sample space is usually denoted as

as a shorthand for

The associated measure is called the Bernoulli measure

The σ-algebra  on X is the product sigma algebra; that is, it is the (countable) direct product of the σ-algebras of the finite set {1, ..., N}.  Thus, the triplet

is a measure space. Given a cylinder set , its measure is

The equivalent expression, using the notation of probability theory, is

for the random variables 

The Bernoulli scheme, as any stochastic process, may be viewed as a dynamical system by endowing it with the shift operator T where

Since the outcomes are independent, the shift preserves the measure, and thus T is a measure-preserving transformation. The quadruplet

is a measure-preserving dynamical system, and is called a Bernoulli scheme or a Bernoulli shift. It is often denoted by

The N = 2 Bernoulli scheme is called a Bernoulli process.  The Bernoulli shift can be understood as a special case of the Markov shift, where all entries in the adjacency matrix are one, the corresponding graph thus being a clique.

Matches and metrics
The Hamming distance provides a natural metric on a Bernoulli scheme. Another important metric is the so-called  metric, defined via a supremum over string matches.

Let  and  be two strings of symbols. A match is a sequence M of pairs  of indexes into the string, i.e. pairs such that  understood to be totally ordered.

This satisfies the triangle inequality only when  and so is not quite a true metric; despite this, it is commonly called a "distance" in the literature.

Generalizations
Most of the properties of the Bernoulli scheme follow from the countable direct product, rather than from the finite base space.  Thus, one may take the base space to be any standard probability space , and define the Bernoulli scheme as

This works because the countable direct product of a standard probability space is again a standard probability space.

As a further generalization, one may replace the integers  by a countable discrete group , so that 

For this last case, the shift operator is replaced by the group action

for group elements  and  understood as a function  (any direct product  can be understood to be the set of functions , as this is the exponential object). The measure  is taken as the Haar measure, which is invariant under the group action: 

These generalizations are also commonly called Bernoulli schemes, as they still share most properties with the finite case.

Properties
Ya. Sinai demonstrated that the Kolmogorov entropy of a Bernoulli scheme is given by

This may be seen as resulting from the general definition of the entropy of a Cartesian product of probability spaces, which follows from the asymptotic equipartition property.  For the case of a general base space  (i.e. a base space which is not countable), one typically considers the relative entropy. So, for example, if one has a countable partition  of the base Y, such that , one may define the entropy as

In general, this entropy will depend on the partition; however, for many dynamical systems, it is the case that the symbolic dynamics is independent of the partition (or rather, there are isomorphisms connecting the symbolic dynamics of different partitions, leaving the measure invariant), and so such systems can have a well-defined entropy independent of the partition.

Ornstein isomorphism theorem 
The Ornstein isomorphism theorem states that two Bernoulli schemes with the same entropy are isomorphic. The result is sharp, in that very similar, non-scheme systems, such as Kolmogorov automorphisms, do not have this property.

The Ornstein isomorphism theorem is in fact considerably deeper: it provides a simple criterion by which many different measure-preserving dynamical systems can be judged to be isomorphic to Bernoulli schemes.   The result was surprising, as many systems previously believed to be unrelated proved to be isomorphic. These include all finite stationary stochastic processes, subshifts of finite type, finite Markov chains, Anosov flows, and Sinai's billiards: these are all isomorphic to Bernoulli schemes.

For the generalized case, the Ornstein isomorphism theorem still holds if the group G is a countably infinite amenable group.

Bernoulli automorphism
An invertible, measure-preserving transformation of a standard probability space (Lebesgue space) is called a Bernoulli automorphism if it is isomorphic to a Bernoulli shift.

Loosely Bernoulli
A system is termed "loosely Bernoulli" if it is Kakutani-equivalent to a Bernoulli shift; in the case of zero entropy, if it is Kakutani-equivalent to an irrational rotation of a circle.

See also
 Shift of finite type
 Markov chain
 Hidden Bernoulli model

References

Markov models
Ergodic theory
Symbolic dynamics